Abele Ambrosini (Cercino, 1915 – Cephalonia, 21 September 1943) was an Italian partisan.

Biography 
Called to arms in 1939, he was sent to Albania and Greece. During the armistice he was situated in Cephalonia, acting as Lieutenant of the 33rd Artillery Regiment of the Acqui Division. Captured by the Germans during a firefight, Ambrosini was killed shortly after.

Awards 

He was awarded the Gold Medal of Military Valor posthumously.

References

See also 
 Massacre of the Acqui Division

Recipients of the Gold Medal of Military Valor
1943 deaths
1915 births